Sofus Berger Brix (born 2 June 2003) is a Danish professional footballer who plays as a midfielder for Viborg FF. He is a Danish youth international.

Career
Born in Viborg, Berger began playing for Overlund GF at age 5 before moving to the Viborg FF academy at U13 level.

On 6 August 2019, Berger made his senior debut in the first round of the Danish Cup in a 2–1 away win after extra-time over Jammerbugt. He made his league debut in the Danish 1st Division – the second tier of Danish football – a few days later on 11 August in a 0–0 draw against HB Køge, coming on as a substitute in the 80th minute for Mikkel Agger. He scored his first goal on 19 July 2020 in a 1–1 draw against Vejle Boldklub.

Being part of the Viborg-team winning promotion to the Danish Superliga in the 2020–21 season, Berger made his debut at the highest level on 18 July 2021 as a starter in a 2–1 away win over Nordsjælland.

He made his European debut on 21 July 2022, coming on as a late substitute in the UEFA Europa Conference League qualifier against Sūduva and slotting home to 1–0 winner shortly after.

Career statistics

Club

Honours
Viborg
Danish 1st Division: 2020–21

References

External links
 
 

2003 births
Living people
Danish men's footballers
Denmark youth international footballers
Association football midfielders
Viborg FF players
Danish 1st Division players
Danish Superliga players
People from Viborg Municipality
Sportspeople from the Central Denmark Region